Knights of the New Thunder is the second studio album by the Norwegian heavy metal band TNT. It was the first TNT album recorded with their new vocalist Tony Harnell, who had replaced their original singer Dag Ingebrigtsen.

Most of the songs on the album had been written and recorded as demos while Ingebrigtsen was still in the band, but most of the lyrics were rewritten by Harnell. Some of the song titles were also changed; "Toys for Boys" and "Black Sheep of Valhalla" became "Break the Ice" and "Knights of the Thunder", respectively. Two songs from TNT's self-titled first album, "USA" and "Eddie", were re-recorded and included on the album, though "Eddie" was an exclusive bonus track on the CD edition in Europe, and replaced "Tor with the Hammer" on U.S. editions. "Eddie" also came on the single American Tracks bundled with the LP in Europe.

This was their last album playing traditional heavy metal, as their later releases have a more glam metal style.

The album's original cover art featured an illustration of half-naked women and caused controversy in Norway. A new cover was made and used for the national and international editions, except for Japan where the album was released with its original cover.

Track listing

Personnel

Band 
Tony Harnell – vocals (credited as Tony Hansen)
Ronni Le Tekrø – guitars
Morty Black – bass guitar, synthesizer
Diesel Dahl – drums, percussion (credited as Diesel Scan-Dahl)

Additional personnel
Bård Svendsen – keyboards and background vocals

Album credits 
Bjørn Nessjø – producer
Rune Nordahl – engineer

Sources
http://www.cduniverse.com/search/xx/music/pid/1268101/a/Knights+Of+The+New+Thunder.htm
http://www.ronniletekro.com/discography-album-9.html

References

1984 albums
TNT (Norwegian band) albums